Schausiella is a genus of moths in the family Saturniidae first described by Eugène Louis Bouvier in 1930.

Species
Schausiella arpi (Schaus, 1892)
Schausiella carabaya (W. Rothschild, 1907)
Schausiella denhezorum Lemaire, 1969
Schausiella janeira (Schaus, 1892)
Schausiella longispina (W. Rothschild, 1907)
Schausiella moinieri Lemaire, 1969
Schausiella polybia (Stoll, 1781)
Schausiella santarosensis Lemaire, 1982
Schausiella spitzi Travassos, 1958
Schausiella subochreata (Schaus, 1904)
Schausiella toulgoeti Lemaire, 1969

References

Ceratocampinae
Taxa named by Eugène Louis Bouvier